Kpanga Kabonde Chiefdom is a chiefdom in Pujehun District of Sierra Leone. Its capital is Pujehun town.

References 

Chiefdoms of Sierra Leone
Southern Province, Sierra Leone